Joris van der Hoeven (born 1971) is a Dutch mathematician and computer scientist, specializing in algebraic analysis and computer algebra. He is the primary developer of GNU TeXmacs.

Education and career
Joris van der Hoeven received in 1997 his doctorate from Paris Diderot University (Paris 7) with thesis Asymptotique automatique. He is a Directeur de recherche at the CNRS and head of the team Max Modélisation algébrique at the Laboratoire d'informatique of the École Polytechnique.

Research
His research deals with transseries (i.e. generalizations of formal power series) with applications to algebraic analysis and asymptotic solutions of nonlinear differential equations. In addition to transseries' properties as part of differential algebra and model theory, he also examines their algorithmic aspects as well as those of classical complex function theory.

He is the main developer of GNU TeXmacs (a free scientific editing platform) and Mathemagix (free software, a computer algebra and analysis system).

In 2019, van der Hoeven and his coauthor David Harvey announced their discovery of the fastest known multiplication algorithm, allowing the multiplication of -bit binary numbers in time . Their paper was peer reviewed and published in the Annals of Mathematics in 2021.

Recognition
In 2018, he was an Invited Speaker (with Matthias Aschenbrenner and Lou van den Dries) with the talk On numbers, germs, and transseries at the International Congress of Mathematicians in Rio de Janeiro. In 2018, the three received the Karp Prize.

Selected publications

Articles

 2001
 2002

 2016
 2016
 2017

Books

References

20th-century Dutch mathematicians
21st-century Dutch mathematicians
Dutch computer scientists
Paris Diderot University alumni
1971 births
Living people
Academic staff of École Polytechnique